Brynjar Hoff (born 1 October 1940) is a Norwegian oboist.

Hoff was born in Orkdal to organists Erling Hoff and Magnhild Bergljot Bakken. He was associated with the Trondheim Symphony Orchestra 1955–1958, the Norwegian National Opera and Ballet 1958–1965, and the Oslo Philharmonic 1965–1985, and was later freelance musician. His awards include Spellemannprisen from 1973, the Oslo City art award from 1989, and the King's Medal of Merit in gold from 1999.

References

1940 births
Living people
People from Orkdal
Norwegian musicians
Norwegian oboists
Male oboists
20th-century Norwegian musicians
Spellemannprisen winners
Recipients of the King's Medal of Merit in gold
20th-century Norwegian male musicians